Anne Barlow is a curator and director in the field of international contemporary art, and is currently Director of Tate St Ives, Art Fund Museum of the Year 2018. There she directs and oversees the artistic vision and programme, including temporary exhibitions, collection displays, artist residencies, new commissions, and a learning and research programme. At Tate St Ives, Barlow has curated solo exhibitions of work by artists including Thảo Nguyên Phan (2022), Petrit Halilaj (2021), Haegue Yang (2020), Otobong Nkanga (2019), Huguette Caland (2019), Amie Siegel (2018) and Rana Begum (2018). She was also co-curator of "Naum Gabo: Constructions for Real Life" (2020) and collaborating curator with Castello di Rivoli, Turin for Anna Boghiguian at Tate St Ives (2019).

Career 

Barlow was formerly Artistic Director of Tate St Ives (2017–2018) and Director of Art in General in New York City (2007–2016). During her tenure at Art in General, she commissioned and curated projects with artists including: Dineo Seshee Bopape (2016); Donna Huanca (2015); Adelita Husni-Bey (2015); Marwa Arsanios (2015); Basim Magdy (2014); Sara Greenberger Rafferty (2014); Jill Magid (2013); Meriç Algün Ringborg (2013); Shezad Dawood (2013); Anetta Mona Chişa and Lucia Tkáčová (2013); Ohad Meromi (2010); Surasi Kusolwong (2007) and Ana Prvacki (2007). Barlow also initiated and oversaw programmatic partnerships with arts organizations in Brisbane, Bucharest, Cairo, Holon, Lisbon, London, Manchester, Riga, Tallinn, Tbilisi, Vilnius, Warsaw, and Zagreb. In 2014, she launched Art in General’s award-winning annual symposium "What Now?" on critical and timely issues in the field, establishing an educational partnership with the Vera List Center for Art and Politics at The New School, New York, and overseeing the symposia “Collaboration and Collectivity” (2014); “The Politics of Listening” (2015); and “On Future Identities” (2016).

Barlow has curated and contributed to a number of biennial projects including “Tactics for the Here and Now”; “North by Northeast”, Latvian Pavilion at the 55th Venice Biennale (Co-Curator, 2013); 2nd Tbilisi Triennial, Georgia (Guest project curator, 2015) and “Shifts and Interruptions” for The Jerusalem Show VII, presented in framework of second Qalandiya International (Guest film curator, 2014). In 2013, she curated the Centennial Edition “Armory Open Forum” program for The Armory Show, New York.

Prior to Art in General, Barlow was Curator of Education and Media Programs at the New Museum, New York (1999–2007) where she led the department’s new media, public programs, and collaborative projects. From 2004–2006, she conceptualized and developed the "Museum as Hub" initiative and established its first partnerships in Cairo, Eindhoven, Mexico City, and Seoul. She also curated numerous museum and on-line exhibitions; initiated and produced the museum’s Digital Culture Programs; and organized inter-disciplinary roundtables, public programs, performances and broadcasts. She was formerly Curator of Contemporary Art and Design at Glasgow Museums (1994–1999), where she oversaw its collection of international contemporary art and design, exhibitions program, artists’ residencies, commissions, and new acquisitions.

Barlow has been a jury member of numerous selection panels and awards including: British Pavilion Selection Committee, 58th Venice Biennale (2019); MAC International 2018, Belfast, Northern Ireland (2018); “Montblanc Cultural Foundation Curatorium” (2017–2019); Curatorial Advisory Committee, Mumbai Art Room, India (2017–ongoing); Exposure 8, Beirut Art Center, Lebanon (2016); kim? Contemporary Art Award, Latvia (2016 and 2015); T-HT Award, Zagreb, Croatia (2014); and the Akbank Curatorial Prize, Istanbul, Turkey (2013). Barlow has also been a panelist/advisor to funding organizations including: Creative Capital, New York (2005 and 2006); New York State Council on the Arts (2003–2005); and the Rockefeller Foundation (2002 and 2003); and has lectured, moderated or participated in talks at organizations including Istanbul Modern (2020); Govett-Brewster Gallery, New Plymouth, New Zealand (2019); Art Basel Conversations Programme, Art Basel Hong Kong (2019); Tate Modern (2018 and 2019); the Institute of Modern Art, Brisbane (2015); the Sharjah Art Foundation (2012); IASPIS Stockholm (2011); ARCO Madrid (2011); Center for Contemporary Art, Warsaw (2009); and the IMLS National Leadership Awards (2004).

Publications 

Barlow is editor/contributor to a number of publications including:
 “The Potential of Transparency” in Naum Gabo: Constructions for Real Life, Tate St Ives, UK (co-editor and contributor, 2020) 
“Otobong Nkanga in Conversation with Anne Barlow” in Otobong Nkanga: From Where I Stand, Tate St Ives, UK (co-editor and contributor, 2019)
“Introduction” in Huguette Caland, Tate St Ives, UK (co-editor and contributor, 2019)
“PASS No. 1”, International Biennial Association (co-editor 2018)
“What Now? On Future Identities”, Art in General, New York and Black Dog Publishing, United Kingdom (co-editor, 2017)
 “What Now? The Politics of Listening”, Art in General, New York, and Black Dog Publishing, United Kingdom (editor, 2016)
 “On Faith”, in “We Are All in This Alone”, Pavilion of the Republic of Macedonia, 56th Venice Biennale (contributor, 2015)
 “March Meeting 2012": Working with Artists and Audiences on Commissions and Residencies”, Paperback, 594 pages, 91 visuals, English and Arabic, Sharjah Art Foundation, United Arab Emirates (editor, 2014)
 “Basim Magdy: Fictions of the Real”, Film Program, Tate Modern, London, United Kingdom (2013)
 “Pigeons on the Grass Alas: Contemporary Curators Talk About The Field”, eds. Paula Marincola and Peter Nesbitt, The Pew Center for Arts & Heritage, Philadelphia (contributor, 2013)
 “Only at the South Pole Do All Directions Point North”, in North by North East, Pavilion of Latvia at the 55th Venice Biennale, May 2013
 “Anna K.E.” ed. Sabine Becker, Hatje Cantz Verlag, Ostfildern, Germany (contributor, 2012)
 "Realities:united Featuring", ed. Florian Heilmeyer, Ruby Press, Berlin, Germany (contributor, 2010)
 “Jacqueline Fraser”, essay for Artes Mundi Prize catalogue, Cardiff, Wales (contributor, 2004)
 “Naum Gabo”, in Sculpture in 20th Century Britain, Henry Moore Institute, Leeds (contributor, 2003)
 “Copy It, Steal It, Share It”, Borusan Art Gallery, Istanbul, Turkey (contributor, 2003)

Barlow has also published in numerous arts magazines and journals such as ArteEast Quarterly, ArtPulse Magazine, The Journal for Curatorial Studies, and Ibraaz.

Education 

Barlow holds a Masters in the History of Art from the University of Glasgow, Scotland.

References

External links 
 Tate St Ives
 Art in General

Living people
British arts administrators
Women arts administrators
British art curators
Year of birth missing (living people)
British women curators